Homs is a city in Syria.

Homs may also refer to:
 Homs Governorate, Syria
 Homs District
 Homs Sanjak, administrative area of Syria within Ottoman Empire
 Lake Homs, an artificial lake upstream from Homs, in Syria
 Lake Homs Dam, that created the lake
 Jund Homs, a district of medieval Syria
 Battle of Homs (disambiguation), the name of several battles
 Siege of Homs
 Homs Camp, a Palestinian refugee camp in Homs
 Syriac Catholic Archeparchy of Homs
 Al-Khums, a city in Libya
 Al-Khums Governorate, a former governorate of Libya

People with the surname 
 Joaquim Homs (1906–2003), Spanish composer
 Francesc Homs Molist (born 1969), Spanish politician
 Ramón Homs (born 1974), Spanish alpine skier
 Alicia Homs Ginel (born 1993), Spanish politician
 Verónica Homs, Spanish model

See also 
 Hims al-Andalus
 Hom (disambiguation)